Nabil Ayouch (born 1 April 1969) is a Franco-Moroccan television and film director, producer, and writer. His films have screened at international film festivals including the Cannes Film Festival and Montreal World Film Festival.

Early life 
Ayouch was born in 1969 in Paris, to a Moroccan father,  and a French mother of Tunisian-Jewish descent. His brother is fellow director Hicham Ayouch. After his parents' divorce, he spent a large part of his childhood in the suburb of Sarcelles, visiting Casablanca in the summers.

Ayouch cites discovering international cinema at the local cultural centre, Forum des Cholettes, as inspiring his filmmaking career.

Film career
Ayouch started his career as a scriptwriter and director with the advertising agency Euro-RSCG. In 1992, he directed Les Pierres bleues du désert, a first short film with Jamel Debbouze which tells the history of a young man convinced that there are large blue stones in the desert.

In 1993, Ayourch ended up settling in Casablanca, where he directed two short films, Hertzienne Connexion (1993) and Vendeur de silence (1994), for which he received international recognition.

In 1997, Ayouch directed his first feature film Mektoub, which represented Morocco at the Oscars. He also directed the feature films Une Minute de soleil en moins (2003) and Whatever Lola Wants (2008), produced by Pathé.

In 1999, Ayouch created a production company called Ali n'Productions to aid aspiring young directors in establishing their careers. He won the Ecumenical Award in 2000 in the Montreal World Film Festival for his film Ali Zaoua: Prince of the Streets. Ayouch is set to produce the French-Moroccan thriller film Mirages.

Ayouch's 2012 film Horses of God is based on Mahi Binebine’s novel The Stars of Sidi Moumen. In Horses of God, Ayouch explores the radicalization that can occur from poverty and extreme machismo, alluding to the 2003 Casablanca bombings. The film competed in the Un Certain Regard section at the 2012 Cannes Film Festival.  It was also Morocco's submission for the 85th Academy Awards (held in February 2013).

In 2021, Ayouch's film Casablanca Beats was selected for the 74th Cannes Film Festival competition.

Ayouch is a member of the Academy of Motion Pictures, the Académie des Césars, and the Arab Film Academy.

Controversy 
Ayouch's film Much Loved, which takes place in Marrakesh and includes scenes of prostitutes servicing wealthy Saudi clients, was banned in 2015 by Morocco's communications minister Mustapha Khalfi to “protect freedom of expression, which absolutely does not mean freedom of absurdity and destruction in cinema.” Ayouch reportedly experienced death threats after the film was screened at Cannes Film Festival.

Personal life 
Ayouch works and lives in Casablanca. He is married to fellow Moroccan filmmaker and actress Maryam Touzani.

Filmography

As director 
 Les Pierres bleues du désert (1992)
 Mektoub (1997)
 Ali Zaoua, prince de la rue (2000) a.k.a. Ali Zaoua: Prince of the Streets (USA)
 Une minute de soleil en moins (2003) (TV) a.k.a. A Minute of Sun Less (International: English title)
 Whatever Lola Wants (2007)
 Horses of God (2012)
 Much Loved (2015)
 Razzia (2017)
 Casablanca Beats (2021)

As writer 
 Les Pierres bleues du désert (1992)
 Mektoub (1997)
 Ali Zaoua, prince de la rue (2000) a.k.a. Ali Zaoua: Prince of the Streets (USA)
 Une minute de soleil en moins (2003) (TV) a.k.a. A Minute of Sun Less (International: English title)
 Whatever Lola Wants (2007) co-written with Jane Hawksley

As producer 
 2000: Ali Zaoua: Prince of the Streets (associate producer) 
 2006: Tiwarga (TV Movie)
 2006: Heart Edges
 2008: Houti Houta (TV Movie)
 2010: L'Equipe (The Team) (TV Series)
 2010: Al ferka (TV Series)
 2010: 3ichk al baroud 2010 (TV Movie)
 2010: Mirages
 2011: My Land (Documentary)
 2011: Zinat Al Hayat (TV Series) (executive producer) 
 2012: Quand ils dorment (Short)
 2012: Horses of God
 2013: Une bonne leçon (TV Movie) (line producer: Morocco) 
 2013: C'est eux les chiens...
 2015: Much Loved
 2015: Aji-Bi (Documentary)
 2015: All Three of Us (line producer: Morocco) 
 2015: Aya Goes to the Beach (Short)
 2017: Pluie de sueur
 2017: Zwaj El Waqt (TV Movie documentary)
 2019: Wadrari (Documentary)
 2019: Adam

Decorations 
 Chevalier of the Order of Arts and Letters (2015)

Further reading
 Jonathan Smolin, "Nabil Ayouch: Transgression, Identity, and Difference" in: Josef Gugler (ed.), Ten Arab Filmmakers: Political Dissent and Social Critique, Indiana University Press, 2015, pp 214–244

References

External links
 

1969 births
Chevaliers of the Ordre des Arts et des Lettres
French film directors
French film producers
20th-century French Jews
French male screenwriters
French people of Moroccan descent
French people of Tunisian-Jewish descent
French screenwriters
Living people
Moroccan film directors
Moroccan film producers
Moroccan screenwriters
Moroccan people of Tunisian descent
Moroccan writers